Chelles Battle Pro was created in 2001 and it is held every year in Chelles, France. There are two competitions. One is a kids competition for solo b-boys and b-girls who are 12 years old or younger. The other competition is a knock-out tournament for eight b-boy crews. Some crews have to qualify at their country's local tournament; others are invited straight to the finale.

In 2014, Chelles Battle Pro is partnering up with Undisputed  to create The Undisputed World BBoy Series, the world's first B-Boying series connecting different events around the globe, one of which is Battle Pro. The winner of Battle Pro 1 vs 1 joins the other champions from other international events in the series to meet in the Undisputed Masters event and battle to establish who is the supreme champion, who is “Undisputed”.

Winners

2018 Results

2018 Crew Battle 8 on 8 Results
Location: Lille, France

Crews in bold won their respective battles.

2017 Results

2017 Crew Battle 8 on 8 Results
Location: Toulouse, France

Crews in bold won their respective battles.

2017 Undisputed Battle 1 on 1 Results
Location: Toulouse, France

Individuals in bold won their respective battles.

2016 Results

2016 Crew Battle 8 on 8 Results
Location: Marseille, France

Crews in bold won their respective battles.

2016 Undisputed Battle 1 on 1 Results
Location: Marseille, France

Individuals in bold won their respective battles.

2015 Results

2015 Crew Battle 8 on 8 Results
Location: Chelles, France

Crews in bold won their respective battles.

2015 Undisputed Battle 1 on 1 Results
B-boys in bold won their respective battles.

2014 Results

2014 Crew Battle 8 on 8 Results
Location: Chelles, France

Crews in bold won their respective battles.

2014 Undisputed Battle 1 on 1 Results
Location: Chelles, France

Individuals in bold won their respective battles.

Due to flight complications, C-Lil was not able to attend and was replaced by Cri6.
Menno earned the first bid to the Undisputed World BBoy Series at the end of the 2014 year by winning Chelles Pro.

2013 Results

2013 Crew Battle 8 on 8 Results
Location: Chelles, France

Crews in bold won their respective battles.

2012 Results

2012 Crew Battle 8 on 8 Results
Location: Chelles, France

Crews in bold won their respective battles.

References

External links
Chelles Battle Pro X Undisputed
Undisputed World Bboy Series Official site
Chelles Battle Pro history by Bboyworld.com

Breakdance
Street dance competitions